Iman (also 'recognition') in Islamic theology denotes a believer's 
recognition in faith and deeds in the religious aspects of Islam.

The term  has been delineated in both the Quran and hadith. According to the Quran,  must be accompanied by righteous deeds and the two together are necessary for entry into Paradise.

There exists a debate both within and outside Islam on the link between faith and reason in religion, and the relative importance of either. Some scholars contend that faith and reason spring from the same source and must be harmonious.

Etymology 

Definition and meaning 
In a hadith, the Islamic prophet Muhammad defined  as "an acknowledgement in the heart, a voicing with the tongue, and an activity with the limbs." Faith is confidence in a real truth. When people have confidence, they submit themselves to that truth. It is not sufficient just to know the truth, but the recognition of the heart should be expressed by the tongue which is the manifestation of intelligence and at last to reflect this confidence in their activities.

The definition of  according to Ahl al-Sunnah wa'l-Jama'ah is:

Ibn 'Abd al-Barr said:
Al-Shafi'i said in :
Muhammad bin Ismail bin Muhammad bin Al-Fadl Al-Taymi Al-Asbhani said:
Sufyan ibn 'Uyaynah said:
Al-Ash'ari said:

The Six Articles of Faith 
Faith includes six primary beliefs:

 Belief in the existence and oneness of God.
 Belief in the existence of angels.
 Belief in the existence of the books of which God is the author: the Quran (revealed to Muhammad), the Gospel (revealed to Jesus), the Torah (revealed to prophets and messengers amongst the Children of Israel), Psalms (revealed to David), the Scrolls of Moses, and the Scrolls of Abraham.
 Belief in the existence of prophets: Muhammad being the last of them, Jesus the penultimate, and others sent before them [like Moses, Abraham, David, Joseph, Jacob].
 Belief in the existence of the Day of Judgment: in that day, humanity will be divided into two groups: that of paradise and that of hell. These groups are composed of subgroups.
 Belief in the existence of God's predestination due to God's omniscience, whether it involves good or bad.

Of these, the first four are mentioned and the sixties are implied in  2:285 of the Quran.

Another similar narration ascribed to Muhammad is:

Delineation in the Qur'an and hadith 

In the Qur'an, iman is one of the 10 qualities which cause one to be the recipient of God's mercy and reward. The Qur'an states that faith can grow with the remembrance of God. The Qur'an also states that nothing in this world should be dearer to a true believer than faith.

Muhammad is reported to have said that he gained sweetness of faith and was pleased to accept God as Lord, Islam as religion and Muhammad as a prophet. He also said that no one can be a true believer unless he loves Muhammad more than his children, parents and relatives. At another instance, he remarked that it is this love with Allah and Muhammad after which a person can be aware of the real taste of faith.

Amin Ahsan Islahi, a notable exegete of the Qur'an has clarified the nature of this love:

Islahi and Abul A'la Maududi both have inferred that the Quranic comparison of a good word and a bad word in chapter 14 is a comparison of faith and disbelief. Thus, the Quran is effectively comparing faith to a tree whose roots are deep in the soil and branches spread in the vastness of the sky.

 is also the subject of a supplication uttered by Muhammad to God:

The Seventy-Seven Branches of Faith
"The Seventy-Seven Branches of Faith" is a collection compiled by the Shafi'i imam al-Bayhaqi in his work . In it, he explains the essential virtues that reflect true  (faith and recognition) through related Quranic verses and prophetic sayings.

This is based on the following Hadith ascribed to Muhammad:

These 77 branches described by Bayhaqi are:

Thirty actions connected with the heart:
 Belief in Allah (Testimony of Acknowledgment:  (there is no true god but Allah)
 Acknowledging that first, nothing but Allah existed; then, Allah created everything which subsequently came into existence
 Acknowledging the existence of angels.
 Acknowledging that all the sacred books sent down to the various Prophets are true. However, all books other than the Quran are no longer valid.
 Acknowledging that all prophets are true. However, Muslims are commanded to follow only the Islamic prophet, Muhammad
 Believing that Allah already knows everything and that whatever he permits or wills will happen.
 Believing that the Doomsday will happen.
 Acknowledging the existence of Hell
 Having a love for Allah.
 Acknowledging Muhammad's love for Allah
 To love or hate someone only for the sake of Allah.
 To repent and show remorse when a sin is committed.
 To fear Allah.
 Hoping for God's mercy.
 Being humble.
 Expressing gratitude for favour or favour.
 Fulfilling promises.
 Having patience.
 Feeling inferior to others.
 Be kind to God’s creations.
 To be satisfied with whatever prescribed orders come from Allah
 Trusting in Allah.
 Not to boast or brag about any quality one possesses
 Not to hate or hate anyone.
 Not to be jealous of anyone.
 Not to get angry.
 Not to wish anyone harm.
 To have no love for the world.

The seven works attached to the tongue:
 Reciting the Quran.
 Gaining knowledge.
 Giving knowledge
 Making .
  of Allah.
 Abstaining from the following: lying, backbiting (blasphemy in one's absence), obscenity, cursing, and singing (obscene) songs that are against Shariah.

Forty works are attached to the whole body:
 Performing ablution, bathing and keeping clothes clean.
 To be steadfast in prayer.
 Fasting.
 Performing .
 To perform .
 Moving away or emigrating from a place harmful to religion
 To fulfil the promise made to Allah.
 Fulfilling vows that are not sins.
 Paying expiation for unfulfilled vows.
 To cover the body.
 Sacrificing for Allah
 The shrouding and burial of the deceased.
 Paying off one's debts
 Abstaining from prohibited things while doing financial transactions.
 Not to hide the truth while testifying.
 Marry when  wants to marry.
 Allowing those under oneself to fulfil their rights
 Providing comfort to parents.
 Bringing up children in the right way.
 Not cutting ties with friends or relatives.
 Obeying one's boss
 To be fair and righteous
 Not to initiate any path contrary to the generality of Muslims.
 To obey the ruler, if what they command is not contrary to the Shariah.
 Making peace between two warring factions or individuals.
 Helping the great cause.
 Enjoining good and forbidding wrong.
 If it is the government, then it should provide punishment according to Shariah.
 Struggling against the enemies of religion (if possible with the hand, if not with the tongue (by the pen), if not with the heart).
 Filling the deposit.
 Giving loans to those in need
 Seeing to the needs of one's neighbours.
 Ensuring halal and purity of income earning.
 Expenditure according to Shariah.
 Replying to whoever greets oneself
  when someone says  after sneezing.
 Not harming anyone unfairly.
 Abstaining from sports and pastimes that are against Shariah.
 Removal of gravel, stones, thorns, sticks etc. from the road.

Faith and deeds 
In Islam, there must exist harmony and concord between faith and deeds. Farāhī has explained this aspect in his  in the following manner:

Faith and reason in Islam 
The relationship between reason and faith in Islam is a complex debate spanning centuries. Ismail Raji al-Faruqi states on this subject:

See also 
 Aqidah
 Five Pillars of Islam
 Al-Ikhlas
 Taqwa
 Six Kalimas
 Amin and Amina, names derivant of Iman

References

Citations

Sources

External links 
 77 Branches of Iman (Faith)
 Reality of Iman (Faith) – Meaning and Understanding
 Faith in allah 

Islamic ethics
Islamic terminology
Islamic belief and doctrine
Faith